Phaeoxantha is a genus of tiger beetles in the family Cicindelidae, formerly included within the genus Megacephala.

Species
 Phaeoxantha aequinoctialis (Dejean, 1825)
 Phaeoxantha asperula (Westwood, 1852)
 Phaeoxantha bucephala (W. Horn, 1909)
 Phaeoxantha cruciata (Brulle, 1837)
 Phaeoxantha epipleuralis Horn, 1923
 Phaeoxantha klugii Chaudoir, 1850
 Phaeoxantha limata (Perty, 1830)
 Phaeoxantha lindemannae (Mandl, 1964)
 Phaeoxantha testudinea (Klug, 1834)
 Phaeoxantha tremolerasi (W. Horn, 1909)
 Phaeoxantha wimmeri (Mandl, 1958)

References

Cicindelidae